Aljame Zuill (born 10 August 1976) is a Bermudian retired international footballer who played as a striker.

Club career
Zuill played as a striker with Devonshire Colts and Devonshire Cougars in the Bermudian Premier Division before joining the Bermuda Hogges in the USL Second Division.

In September 2011 Zuill moved to Dandy Town Hornets from Devonshire Cougars and then left Dandy Town for Wolves in summer 2012. He later played in Bermuda's veteran players' Corona League for North Village Rams.

International career
He made his debut for Bermuda in a November 2004 CONCACAF Gold Cup qualification match against the Cayman Islands and earned a total of 11 caps, scoring 4 goals. He scored a hattrick in a December 2007 friendly match against St Kitts and Nevis.

His final international match was a January 2008 friendly match against Puerto Rico.

International goals
Scores and results list Bermuda's goal tally first.

References

External links

1976 births
Living people
Association football forwards
Bermudian footballers
Bermuda international footballers
Bermuda Hogges F.C. players
Dandy Town Hornets F.C. players
USL Second Division players